The 2006 Open Canada Cup was the 9th edition of the Canadian Soccer League's open league cup tournament running from late May through late September. Ottawa St. Anthony Italia defeated Toronto Lynx 2-0 in the final played at Cove Road Stadium, London, Ontario. Ottawa became the first victorious amateur club in the tournament's history, and first amateur club to claim a purely Canadian treble (Open Canada Cup, Ontario Cup, and The Challenge Trophy). The tournament expanded to include for the first time the Toronto Lynx of the USL First Division at that time the nations top tier division. Notable entries included the reigning Spectator Cup champions Hamilton Serbia, and 2005 Canadian National Challenge Cup, Ontario Cup champions Scarborough GS United both respectively from the Ontario Soccer League.

The Ontario and Quebec amateur clubs began the tournament in the preliminary rounds while the CSL clubs and Toronto Lynx received an automatic bye to the second round. For the fifth straight year London City were awarded the hosting rights to the finals which granted them a wild card match if they were defeated in the earlier rounds. All CSL clubs competed in the competition with the exception of Toronto Croatia which opted out in order to compete in the annual Croatian-North American Soccer Tournament.

Qualification

First round

Second round

Quarter-final

Wild Card Game

Semi-final

Final

Top scorers

References 

Open Canada Cup
Open Canada Cup
Open Canada Cup